The  Tampa Bay Storm season was the 25th season for the franchise, and their 21st in the Tampa Bay area. The team was coached by Dave Ewart and played their home games at the Tampa Bay Times Forum. With a final record of 8–10, the Storm missed the playoffs for the second consecutive season. 2012, was the first season in which the Storm used their new logo and uniform colors.

Standings

Schedule
The Storm began the season on the road against the Chicago Rush on March 10. They played the Spokane Shock in their final regular season game on July 21.

Roster

References

Tampa Bay Storm
Tampa Bay Storm seasons
Tampa Bay Storm